Eliandro dos Santos Gonzaga (born 23 April 1990), better known as Eliandro, is a Brazilian professional footballer who plays as a forward.

Career 
Eliandro was born in São Paulo and was formed in the basic categories of the Cruzeiro. In 2009 because of injuries to Kléber and Wellington Paulista won chance in the team. But after not too many chances early in the Campeonato Brasileiro 2010, was loaned to the Sport Club do Recife, the race of the Campeonato Brasileiro Série B of 2010.

East Bengal 
In August 2022, Eliandro was announced as one of the five foreigners signed by East Bengal for the upcoming season.

On 25 August, he made his debut against Rajasthan United in the Durand Cup, which ended in a 0–0 stalemate. He came on as a 68th-minute substitute for VP Suhair.

Career statistics

Club

References

External links 
goal 
 

1990 births
Living people
Brazilian footballers
Cruzeiro Esporte Clube players
Sport Club do Recife players
América Futebol Clube (MG) players
ABC Futebol Clube players
Ipatinga Futebol Clube players
C.D. Nacional players
FK Žalgiris players
A Lyga players
Primeira Liga players
Brazilian expatriate footballers
Expatriate footballers in Portugal
Brazilian expatriate sportspeople in Portugal
Expatriate footballers in Lithuania
Brazilian expatriate sportspeople in Lithuania
Association football forwards
Footballers from São Paulo